Prince Alessandro della Torre e Tasso, 1st Duke of Castel Duino, full German name: Alexander Karl Egon Theobald Lamoral Johann Baptist Maria, Prinz von Thurn und Taxis (8 July 1881 in Schloss Mzell, Mzell, Kingdom of Bohemia, Austria-Hungary – 11 March 1937 in Castel Duino, Duino, Kingdom of Italy) was a member of the Bohemian branch of the princely House of Thurn and Taxis. Alessandro was created Prince della Torre e Tasso and first Duke of Castel Duino by Victor Emmanuel III of Italy after relocating to the Kingdom of Italy in 1923.

Family
Alessandro was the third child and son of Prince Alexander Johann of Thurn and Taxis and his wife Princess Marie of Hohenlohe-Waldenburg-Schillingsfürst. He was a great-great-great-grandson of Alexander Ferdinand, 3rd Prince of Thurn and Taxis.

First marriage and issue
Alessandro’s first marriage was to Princess Marie Susanne Marguerite Louise de Ligne, daughter of Louis, 9th Prince de Ligne and Elisabeth de La Rochefoucauld, daughter of Sosthène, Duc de Doudeauville, civilly on 27 January 1906 and religiously on 29 January 1906 in Paris. Alessandro and Marie had children together:

 Prince Raimundo della Torre e Tasso, 2nd Duke of Castel Duino (Castel Duino 16 March 1907 – Castel Duino 17 March 1986), married Princess Eugénie of Greece and Denmark
 Prince Luigi della Torre e Tasso (Castel Duino 5 October 1908 – Camillus, New York 25 March 1985) married Frances Goodyear (granddaughter of Buffalo, New York industrialist Charles W. Goodyear in 1939.  They divorced in 1948. Together they had one son, “Sascha” Alexander Frederick Bradley, Prince of Torre e Tasso (1940-2011).
 Princess Margarete of Thurn and Taxis (born at Château de Belœil on 8 November 1909 – died on 21 September 2006), married Prince Gaetano of Bourbon-Parma, youngest child of Robert I, Duke of Parma. Together they had one daughter, Princess Diane Marguerite of Bourbon-Parma.

Alessandro and Marie divorced in 1919.

Second marriage

In 1932, in Vrana, Alessandro married American heiress Helena "Ella" Holbrook Walker.

Ella lived many years beyond her husband’s death in 1937, and worked on the upkeep of the family’s property, Villa Serbelloni at Bellagio, Italy, and left it to the Rockefeller Foundation in her will.

Ancestry

References

1881 births
1937 deaths
People from Nymburk District
People from the Kingdom of Bohemia
Princes of Thurn und Taxis
Italian Roman Catholics
Dukes of Castel Duino
Czech Roman Catholics